Thrombocytopenic purpura are purpura associated with a reduction in circulating blood platelets which can result from a variety of causes, such as kaposi sarcoma.

Types 
By tradition, the term idiopathic thrombocytopenic purpura is used when the cause is idiopathic. However, most cases are now considered to be immune-mediated.

Another form is thrombotic thrombocytopenic purpura.

Diagnosis
Diagnosis is done by the help of symptoms and only blood count abnormality is thrombocytopenia.

Treatment

See also 
 Aspirin
 Hematopoietic ulcer
 Thrombocyte

References

External links 

Vascular-related cutaneous conditions
Coagulopathies